The Academic Library of Tritonia is a library serving the educational and research needs of 3 different universities in Vaasa, Finland.  These universities include University of Vaasa, Vaasa University of Applied Sciences, and Novia University of Applied Sciences.  The library is located in Vaasa and Jakobstad.

History and function

Tritonia started as an collaboration between University of Vaasa, the Vaasa branch of Åbo Akademi University, and Hanken Vaasa.  The goal was to pool their educational resources in a common library that could offer the same material, both digital and otherwise, to all the students and researchers of the respective universities. 

The first Tritonia main building was completed in 2001 and it is located in the heart of the campus of University of Vaasa.  In 2010 Vaasa University of Applied Sciences and Novia University of Applied Sciences joined the collaboration and merged their libraries with Tritonia's. From 2021 the universities included in the Tritonia collaboration are University of Vaasa, Vaasa University of Applied Sciences, and Novia University of Applied Sciences</ref>. In the summer of 2022 Tritonia moved to the current location on campus to the Luotsi building.

The collections in Tritonia reflect the curricula of the respective universities.  The library offers diverse printed and electronic collections. The printed collections are available for everyone. The e-resources are available mainly for students and staff at our universities and universities of applied sciences within the university network and through remote use. The library also has a collection of textbooks for the current courses held at the different universities.  The library has also a few special collections that are only accessible through special permission, due to the collections historical and rare nature. </ref>

The library provides courses on information retrieval for the students and the researchers of the universities.<ref>Education in Information Literacy

The universities have their education in both Finnish and Swedish which means that Tritonia's customer service is bilingual.  Due to the fact that a high number of non-native students study in the respective universities, English is also a commonly-used language.

References

External links
http://www.tritonia.fi/

Education in Ostrobothnia (region)
Vaasa
Libraries in Finland
Libraries established in 2001